The Indonesia Masters Super 100 is an annual badminton tournament held in Indonesia. This tournament is a part of the BWF World Tour tournaments and is leveled in BWF Tour Super 100. This tournament offer prize money of US$75,000.

Venues, host cities, and naming history 
 2018: Bangka Belitung Indonesia Masters 2018: Sahabudin Sports Hall, Pangkal Pinang, Bangka Belitung Islands.
 2019: Yuzu Indonesia Masters 2019 (originally Walikota Malang Indonesia Masters): Ken Arok Sports Hall, Malang, East Java.
 2022: KB Financial Group Indonesia Masters 2022: Platinum Sports Hall, Malang, East Java.

Past winners

Performances by nation

See also
 Indonesia Open
 Indonesia Masters
 Indonesia International

References 

 
Badminton tournaments in Indonesia
Recurring sporting events established in 2018
2018 establishments in Indonesia
Annual sporting events in Indonesia